FK Sloga 1934 is a football club based in Vinica, North Macedonia. They are currently competing in the Macedonian Second League.

History

The club was founded in 1934 as "FK Makedonija Vinica". In 1939, the name was changed to "FK Pakos Vinica" and in 1941 to "FK Plačkovica Vinica". From 1950 the club was named "FK Sloga Vinica" until its collapse in 2009. In 2012 the club was refounded under the current name, "FK Sloga 1934 Vinica" from Zoran Vasevski, Angelcho Goshev, Kiro Kurchiski, Blagoj Dimitrov and Petar Arsov.

In 2001, the club played in the Macedonian Second League, where they placed fourth. However, in the next season (2001–02), the club placed 16th, causing them to be relegated to the Macedonian Third League – East.

Supporters
In 1989, the club formed the supporters group called Ulavi. After the club was re-established, the number of club fans totaled to about 1,500 members.

Honours and Club best position
 Macedonian Second League:
Runners-up (1): 1999–2000
3rd (1): 2021–2022

Current squad
As of 23 February 2023.

References

External links
Sloga 1934 Vinica Facebook 
Club info at MacedonianFootball 
Football Federation of Macedonia 

Sloga Vinica
Association football clubs established in 1934
1934 establishments in Yugoslavia
FK